Halophryne is a genus of toadfishes found in the Pacific and Indian Oceans.

Species
There are currently four recognized species in this genus:
 Halophryne diemensis (Lesueur, 1824) (Banded frogfish)
 Halophryne hutchinsi D. W. Greenfield, 1998
 Halophryne ocellatus Hutchins, 1974 (Ocellate frogfish)
 Halophryne queenslandiae (De Vis, 1882) (Sculptured frogfish)

References

Batrachoididae